Saint Austregisilus (Outril(le), Aoustrille) (died 624) was bishop of Bourges from 612 to 624.  His feast day is 20 May.

Life
A native of Bourges, he was educated as a courtier, he became an attendant at the Court of King Gontram at Chalon-sur-Saône.  However, Austregisilus wanted to become a monk and entered the abbey of Saint-Nizier at Lyon, where he became abbot.  He was elected bishop of Bourges in 612.

He ordained Sulpitius the Pious. Saint Amand studied under him.

The villages of Saint-Outrille and Saint-Aoustrille are named after him.

References

External links
Saint of the Day, May 20: Austregisilus of Bourges at SaintPatrickDC.org
a translation of the Life of Austregisilus

624 deaths
7th-century Frankish bishops
Bishops of Bourges
Year of birth unknown
7th-century Frankish saints
Colombanian saints